David Maidza (born 10 April 1971 in Chipinge) is a former Zimbabwean rugby union player and currently the head coach of the  Varsity Cup team. His usual playing position was centre or winger.

Career

Playing career
He started his playing career in his native Zimbabwe, where he played for the national Under-21 and Under-23 teams. In 1993, he earned a call-up to the national team, where he made his debut against an Arabian Gulf team in a qualifier for the 1995 Rugby World Cup. He made a total of 5 appearances in 1993 and 1994.

In 1996, he moved to South African Currie Cup team , where he remained until 2004. He was also included in the  squad for the 1999 Super 12 season.

Coaching career

References

1971 births
Living people
Zimbabwean rugby union players
Zimbabwean rugby union coaches
Sportspeople from Manicaland Province
Rugby union centres
Rugby union wings
Alumni of St. John's College (Harare)